The 1847 Texas gubernatorial election was held on November 1, 1847 to elect the governor of Texas. Incumbent Governor James Pinckney Henderson did not run for a second term. The election was won by George Tyler Wood, who received 49% of the vote.

Results

References

1847 United States gubernatorial elections
Gubernatorial
1847
November 1847 events